The Union of North American Vietnamese Student Associations (UNAVSA) is a 501(c)(3) non-profit, community-based organization founded in 2004 as a means for Vietnamese organizations from across North America to network, share common resources, collaborate with one another to build strong sustainable communities, and engage in philanthropic work.

History 

During the Third International Vietnamese Youth Conference in 2003 in San Diego, there were initial talks for creating a network of Vietnamese Student Associations in North America modeled after the Federal Vietnamese Students Association of Australia. Through a collaboration of the Union of Vietnamese Student Associations of Southern California along with the New England Intercollegiate Vietnamese Student Association, the first North American Vietnamese Student Associations (NAVSA) conference was held in the Summer of 2004 in Boston, and with that NAVSA was born. Only with the second conference in 2005 in Chicago, was the name of NAVSA changed to The Union of North American Vietnamese Student Associations (UNAVSA) to better reflect that nature of this organization as a union.

Regional Partners 
 Union of Vietnamese Student Associations of Southern California
 Union of Vietnamese Student Associations of Northern California
 Northwest Vietnamese Student Association
 Southwest Union of Vietnamese Student Associations
 Union of Vietnamese Student Associations of the South
 Union of Vietnamese Student Associations of the Gulf Coast
 Union of Vietnamese Student Associations of the Southeast
 Mid-Atlantic Union of Vietnamese Student Associations
 Union of Vietnamese Student Associations of the Midwest
 New England Intercollegiate Vietnamese Student Associations
Northeast Union of Vietnamese Student Associations
United Vietnamese Student Associations of Eastern Canada
 [Inactive: Central Union of Vietnamese Student Associations]

Conferences 

The UNAVSA conference attracts hundreds of undergraduates, graduates, and young professionals from around the country participate in the multi-day event to hone their leadership skills, hold discussions with distinguished speakers, and explore issues in the Vietnamese community domestically and abroad.  The majority of attendees are current and future officers of Vietnamese American student groups (VSAs, VSUs, UVSAs, etc.) seeking to develop personal leadership abilities, build organizational management skills and network with other leaders from around the country.

Collective Philanthropy Project 
The CPP is an initiative created in 2004 for Vietnamese-American students and community organizations to collaborate toward a common charitable cause. The CPP's goal is to further UNAVSA's mission of developing leadership, preserving the Vietnamese heritage, and creating a unified national effort to help those in need. Each year, the top three candidates are asked to present their projects at the UNAVSA national conference. After the attendees vote, a beneficiary is announced at the conference banquet. In years past, CPP has partnered with several non-profit organizations, raising over $300,000 in the last seven years.

Presidents 

The UNAVSA executive board is headed by the President. The current President is Phuc Hong Phan, who took over from Thoa Kim Nguyen in 2018 and will conclude his term at the UNAVSA Conference in 2020. The President is responsible for the strategic direction of UNAVSA and is tasked with ensuring the organization is operating within the scope defined by its partner organizations.

{| class="wikitable" style="font-size:90%; text-align:left;"
|+ style="padding-top:1em;" |List of UNAVSA Presidents
! No. !! Name !! Region of origin !! Took office !! Left office !! Note
|-
| 1 || Quoc Phan || Southern California || 4 July 2004 || 31 July 2005 ||
|-
| 2 || Tony Ngo || Southern California || 31 July 2005 || 16 July 2006 || 
|-
| 3 || Hai Ton || Northern California || 16 July 2006 || 3 August 2008 || First two-year President
|-
| 4 || Brian Vo || Mid-Atlantic || 3 August 2008 || 1 August 2010 || 
|-
| 5 || Dan Huynh || Midwest || 1 August 2010 || 29 July 2012 || 
|-
| 6 || Lan Anh Nguyen || Mid-Atlantic || 29 July 2012 || 27 July 2014 ||First female President
|-
| 7 || My-Phuong Ly || Midwest || 27 July 2014 || 24 July 2016 ||
|-
| 8 || Thoa Kim Nguyen || Southwest || 24 July 2016 || 5 August 2018 ||
|-
| 9 || Phuc Hong Phan || Southeast || 5 August 2018 || 2020 ||
|-
| 10 || Philip Nguyen || Northern California || 2020 || Present ||
}

See also 
 List of Vietnamese American Groups
 Union of Vietnamese Student Associations of Southern California
 Vietnamese Student Association
 International Vietnamese Youth Conference

External links
 Official UNAVSA Website
 Official CPP Website
 Official UNAVSA Conference Website
 Official UNAVSA Knowledge Base

Vietnamese community organizations
Vietnamese students' associations
Groups of students' unions
Overseas Vietnamese organizations in the United States